Lee House may refer to:

United States

Alaska
Jesse Lee Home for Children, Seward, Alaska, listed on the National Register of Historic Places (NRHP) in Kenai Peninsula Borough

Arkansas
Carl and Esther Lee House, Damascus, Arkansas, listed on the NRHP in Van Buren County
R.E. Lee House, Pine Bluff, Arkansas, listed on the NRHP in Jefferson County

Connecticut
Thomas Lee House, East Lyme, Connecticut, NRHP-listed in New London County
Daniel and Mary Lee House, Portland, Connecticut, listed on the NRHP in Middlesex County

Georgia
 Gordon-Lee House, Chickamauga, Georgia, listed on the NRHP in Walker County
Lee and Gordon Mill, Chickamauga, Georgia, listed on the NRHP in Walker County
Agnes Lee Chapter House of the United Daughters of the Confederacy, Decatur, Georgia, listed on the NRHP in DeKalb County
W. G. Lee Alumni House, Macon, Georgia, listed on the NRHP in Bibb County

Idaho
J.O. Lee House, Jerome, Idaho, listed on the NRHP in Jerome County
J.O. Lee Honey House, Jerome, Idaho, listed on the NRHP in Jerome County

Iowa
Lee House (Independence, Iowa), NRHP-listed

Kentucky
Addison W. Lee House, Louisville, Kentucky, listed on the NRHP in Jefferson County
Lee House (Maysville, Kentucky), NRHP-listed

Massachusetts
Hooper-Lee Nichols House, Cambridge, Massachusetts, NRHP-listed
Jeremiah Lee House, Marblehead, Massachusetts, NRHP-listed

Michigan
John and Rosetta Lee House, Lapeer, Michigan, listed on the NRHP in Lapeer County

Minnesota
Olaf Lee House, St. Paul, Minnesota, NRHP-listed

Mississippi
Lee House (Batesville, Mississippi), NRHP-listed
S. D. Lee House, Columbus, Mississippi, NRHP-listed
Lee-Mitts House, Enterprise, Mississippi, listed on the NRHP in Clarke County
Lee-Dubard House, Grenada, Mississippi, listed on the NRHP in Grenada County

Montana
Lee Homestead, Decker, Montana, listed on the NRHP in Big Horn County
Johnson-Lee House, Kalispell, Montana, listed on the NRHP in Flathead County

Nebraska
George F. Lee Octagon Houses, Nebraska City, Nebraska, NRHP-listed

New Jersey
Stokes-Lee House, Collingswood, New Jersey, NRHP-listed

North Carolina
Gen. William C. Lee House, Dunn, North Carolina, listed on the NRHP in Harnett County
Lovett Lee House, Giddensville, North Carolina, listed on the NRHP in Sampson County
Harry Fitzhugh Lee House, Goldsboro, North Carolina, listed on the NRHP in Wayne County
Jones-Lee House, Greenville, North Carolina, listed on the NRHP in Pitt County
William H. Lee House, Lewiston, North Carolina, listed on the NRHP in Bertie County
Malcolm K. Lee House, Monroe, North Carolina, listed on the NRHP in Union County
James H. Lee House in the Monroe Residential Historic District (Monroe, North Carolina)
Heck-Lee, Heck-Wynne, and Heck-Pool Houses, Raleigh, North Carolina, listed on the NRHP in Wake County

Ohio
Samuel Lee House, Coshocton, Ohio, listed on the NRHP in Coshocton County

Oklahoma
Jeff Lee Park Bath House and Pool, McAlester, Oklahoma, listed on the NRHP in Pittsburg County

Oregon
Dr. Norman L. Lee House, Junction City, Oregon, listed on the NRHP in Pittsburg County
Jason Lee House, Salem, Oregon, listed on the NRHP in Lane County

Tennessee
Samuel B. Lee House, Duplex, Tennessee, listed on the NRHP in Williamson County
James Lee House (239 Adams Avenue, Memphis) in Tennessee, listed on the NRHP in Shelby County
James Lee House (690 Adams Avenue, Memphis), Tennessee, also known as the Harsson-Goyer-Lee House and operated as a business called "James Lee House," listed on the NRHP
Lt. George W. Lee House, Memphis, Tennessee, listed on the NRHP in Shelby County
Lt. George W. Lee House, Memphis, Tennessee, listed on the NRHP in Shelby County
Lee and Fontaine Houses of the James Lee Memorial, Memphis, Tennessee, listed on the NRHP in Shelby County

Texas
Walter J. Lee House, Belton, Texas, listed on the NRHP in Bell County
Link-Lee House, Houston, Texas, listed on the NRHP in Harris County

Utah
John Ruphard Lee House, Beaver, Utah, listed on the NRHP in Beaver County
John E. Lee House, Hyde Park, Utah, listed on the NRHP in Cache County
Charles W. and Leah Lee House, Torrey, Utah, listed on the NRHP in Wayne County

Vermont
Lee Farm, Waterford, Vermont, listed on the NRHP in Caledonia County

Virginia
Arlington House, The Robert E. Lee Memorial, Arlington, Virginia, also known as Custis-Lee Mansion, NRHP-listed
Robert E. Lee Boyhood Home, Alexandria, Virginia, NRHP-listed
Lee-Fendall House, Alexandria, Virginia, NRHP-listed
Lee Hall Mansion, Newport News, Virginia, NRHP-listed
Stewart-Lee House, Richmond, Virginia, listed on the NRHP

West Virginia
Mattie V. Lee Home, Charleston, West Virginia, NRHP-listed
Lee-Longsworth House, Harpers Ferry, West Virginia, NRHP-listed
Lee-Throckmorton-McDonald House, Inwood, West Virginia, listed on the NRHP in Berkeley County
Lighthorse Harry Lee Cabin, Mathias, West Virginia, listed on the NRHP in Hardy County

See also
James Lee House (disambiguation)
Lee Hall (disambiguation)
Fong Lee Company, Oroville, California, listed on the NRHP in Butte County
Don Lee Building, San Francisco, California, listed on the NRHP in San Francisco
Lee Hotel, Yuma, Arizona, listed on the NRHP in Yuma County
Robert E. Lee Hotel (disambiguation)
Robert E. Lee Monument (disambiguation)
Robert E. Lee School (disambiguation)